The Swift County Courthouse is the seat of government for Swift County, Minnesota, United States, located in the city of Benson.  It has been in continual use since its dedication in 1898.  The building was designed in Richardsonian Romanesque style by the architectural firm of Buechner & Jacobson.  The courthouse was listed on the National Register of Historic Places in 1977 for having local significance in the themes of architecture and politics/government.  It was nominated for its longstanding service as the center of Swift County government and for exemplifying the influence of Richardsonian Romanesque style on late-19th-century public buildings.

See also
 List of county courthouses in Minnesota
 National Register of Historic Places listings in Swift County, Minnesota

References

External links
 Swift County District Court

1898 establishments in Minnesota
Buildings and structures in Swift County, Minnesota
County courthouses in Minnesota
Courthouses on the National Register of Historic Places in Minnesota
Government buildings completed in 1898
National Register of Historic Places in Swift County, Minnesota